Witthaya Thamwong (born 18 September 1987 in Lampang, Thailand) is a Thai archer. He competed in the individual event at the 2012 Summer Olympics.

References

External links

 

Witthaya Thamwong
1987 births
Living people
Witthaya Thamwong
Archers at the 2012 Summer Olympics
Archers at the 2016 Summer Olympics
Witthaya Thamwong
Archers at the 2010 Asian Games
Archers at the 2014 Asian Games
Witthaya Thamwong
Witthaya Thamwong
Southeast Asian Games medalists in archery
Archers at the 2018 Asian Games
Competitors at the 2011 Southeast Asian Games
Witthaya Thamwong
Competitors at the 2019 Southeast Asian Games
Witthaya Thamwong
Witthaya Thamwong